The Abetare is a children's textbook written in the Albanian language. It was created to help teach the basic language to children and young adults throughout Albania and the surrounding region where Albanians live. Abetare has played a significant role  in the history of Albanian education and laid the groundwork for literary Albanian which helped raise the national consciousness for future generations. By learning to read and write, young Albanians were introduced to the history and culture of their homeland.

History
The first alphabet book of the Albanian language titled "The very brief and useful Albanian Evetar" was written in 1844 by prominent author of the National Revival period Naum Veqilharxhi. Since that time, more than 150 revised iterations of the Abetare have been printed in Albania and abroad. Veqilharxhi's work was followed by Kostandin Kristoforidhi, another prominent figure of the National Revival period who in 1867 published his own version of the Abetare in both Gheg and Tosk.
Three decades later, on February 27, 1897 in Istanbul, the "Alphabet of the Albanian Language" was published at the initiative of Sami Frashëri, Jani Vreto, Pashko Vasa and Koto Hoxhi, all intellectuals who had founded the Society for the Publication of Albanian Letters.

The drafting of future textbooks of Abetare passed along to other renowned academics like Luigj Gurakuqi, Parashqevi Qiriazi, Nikolla Lako, Simon Shuteriqi and in later years followed by Aleksandër Xhuvani, Thoma Papapano, Mati Logoreci, Jani Minga and others.

In 1946, a more thorough scientific iteration of the Abetare was drafted by author Kolë Xhumari. It was to become the official government approved textbook that was distributed to elementary schools and kindergartens in the country in the next five decades.

After concerns over the quality of education in areas outside Albania, the most common Abetare are now unified between Albania and Kosovo, and regional editions have been updated. The modern Abetare teaches children the alphabet and the syllables of Albanian, mostly through reading. It also focuses on [cursive] writing (shkrim dore) and basic sentence formation.

List of Abetare
 Ëvetarët e Parë Shqip - Naum Veqilharxhi (1844–45)
 Tri Abetarët e Gjuhës Shqipe - Kostandin Kristoforidhi (1867–72)
 Mësoni të shkruani Gjuhën Shqipe - Daut Boriçi (1869)
 Pellazgjika Shqip - Vasil Dhimitër Ruso (1877)
 Abetare e Gjuhës Shqipe - Sami Frashëri (1879)
 Abetarea Shqip - Jovan Risto Terova (1887)
 Tri Abetaret - Parashqevi Qiriazi (1909–15)
 Abetareja Shqip rrieshtuarë në gjuhë të përbashkëme - Simon Shuteriqi (1911)
 Abetaret Xhuvani-Pogoni - Aleksandër Xhuvani, Pertef Pogoni (1922–39)
 Abetare - Kolë Xhumari (1946–1998)

Notes and references
Notes:

Alphabet books
Albanian language